Lopo de Brito was the second Captain of Portuguese Ceylon. Brito succeeded João da Silveira and was appointed in 1518 under Manuel I of Portugal, he was Captain until 1522. He was succeeded by Fernão Gomes de Lemos.

Biography 
He was the second-born son of João de Brito Nogueira, Nobleman of the Royal House and member of the Council of King Manuel I on April 16, 1514, by his wife Dona  Brites de Lima, daughter of the 4th Senhor (Lord) of Regalados; and nephew of Luís de Brito Nogueira, Lord of the Estates of São Lourenço in Lisbon and Santo Estevão in Beja.

He arrived in Portuguese Ceylon around September 1518, sent by the new governor of the Estado da Índia, Diogo Lopes de Sequeira, with the mission - ordered by King Manuel I - to build a stone fortress in Colombo. He was accompanied by his brother, António de Brito, appointed as Alcaide of the fortress, and 400 soldiers, masons and carpenters.

The construction of the fortress had to be carried out in extremely difficult conditions, subject to constant attacks and siege by the military forces of the Kingdom of Kotte, under the orders of its sovereign, Vijayabahu VI. Lopo de Brito resorted to counterattacks to relieve the pressure from the besiegers, namely on June 15, 1519, when he managed, albeit provisionally, to disperse Kotte's forces.

On May 7, 1520, the King of Kotte ordered the total siege of the fortress, with thousands of soldiers, supported by artillery. The siege would last 5 months, and prevented the supply of water and food to the Portuguese. Lopo de Brito asked for help to the governor in Goa, who at the time was absent on an expedition to the Persian Gulf; however, the governor's substitute, Dom Aleixo de Meneses, managed to send relief from Cochin, on 25 August, in a galley commanded by António de Lemos (brother of Fernão Gomes de Lemos, who would later succeed Brito in Colombo) with 50 men-at-arms. Despite the small size of this contingent, which only reached Colombo on 4 October, it could be used for a joint counterattack with Lopo de Brito's forces, causing Kotte's troops to flee. Following this action, Brito managed to negotiate a truce agreement with the King of Kotte, in which he agreed to resume the tribute, that had for years been interrupted, that his father had promised to pay to the King of Portugal.

The peace agreement was seen as a defeat at the court of Kotte, contributing to weakening the King's position and generating a plot that would lead to his assassination in 1521, in the so-called Vijayabā Kollaya (The Sack of Vijayabahu). Subsequently, the three sons of the King divided the Kingdom of Kotte among themselves. The internal upheavals that accompanied this division eased the pressure on the Portuguese in Colombo. Lopo de Brito was thus able to complete the construction of the fortress, "a small square, in a triangular shape, and of so much resistance that it was enough to counter the Sinhalese batteries and to repress the strength of the elephants".

In 1522, Lopo de Brito handed over the Colombo Fortress, "which he had defended so valiantly", to Fernão Gomes de Lemos.

Marriage and children 
He married twice.

His first wife was his cousin Isabel de Brito, daughter of Estevão de Brito, Lord of the Estate of Santo Estevão, in Beja; there were no chlidren from this marriage.

His second wife was Iria de Brito, also his cousin, daughter of Manuel Freire de Andrade (from the House of the Lords of Bobadela), and Germineza de Melo; with succession, in the Lords of the Estate of Valbom, which would later pass through marriage to the Lords of the Honra (Demesne) and Estate of Barbosa.

References

Captains of Ceilão
16th-century Portuguese people
Portuguese nobility